F.C. Internazionale Milano returned to the top echelon of the domestic scene, finishing second to city rivals A.C. Milan in the championship. The relatively narrow four-points margin between the two sides, was explained by Milan drawing several matches when it had already clinched the title, so the result was a lot closer than it was during the course of the season.

Following the indifferent 1991–92 season, Inter sold all of its three German internationals Andreas Brehme, Lothar Matthäus and Jürgen Klinsmann back to Bundesliga. That enabled Inter to purchase several foreign players, and especially playmaker Igor Shalimov and topscorer Rubén Sosa proved vital in Inter's resurgence. Strikers Darko Pančev and Salvatore Schillaci struggled to live up to expectations, which made Sosa's 20 league goals vital.

Squad

Goalkeepers 
  Walter Zenga
  Beniamino Abate

Defenders 
  Giuseppe Bergomi
  Sergio Battistini
  Riccardo Ferri
  Paolo Tramezzani
  Luigi De Agostini
  Antonio Paganin
  Stefano Rossini
  Mirko Taccola
  Marcello Montanari

Midfielders 
  Matthias Sammer
  Angelo Orlando
  Alessandro Bianchi
  Nicola Berti
  Antonio Manicone
  Davide Fontolan
  Igor Shalimov
  Stefano Desideri

Attackers 
  Rubén Sosa
  Salvatore Schillaci
  Darko Pančev

Transfers

Winter

Competitions

Serie A

League table

Results by round

Matches

Top scorers
  Rubén Sosa 20 
  Igor Shalimov 9
  Salvatore Schillaci 6
  Sergio Battistini 5
  Nicola Berti 4
  Matthias Sammer 4

Coppa Italia 

Second round

Round of 16

Quarter-finals

Statistics

Players Statistics

References

Sources
  RSSSF - Italy 1992/93

Inter Milan seasons
Internazionale